Ernie Regehr,  is a Canadian peace researcher and expert in security and disarmament. He co-founded Project Ploughshares, a peace research organization based in Waterloo, Ontario, with Murray Thomson in 1976  and served as its Executive Director for thirty years. Project Ploughshares is an ecumenical project supported by the Canadian Council of Churches. Regehr has been a Canadian NGO representative and expert advisor at numerous international disarmament forums including UN Conferences on Small Arms.

Regehr is currently a Research Fellow at the Institute for Peace and Conflict Studies at Conrad Grebel University College (Waterloo, Ontario) and The Simons Foundation (Vancouver, BC). He also serves on the board of directors of the Africa Peace Forum in Kenya.

Project Ploughshares
After receiving his Bachelor of Arts in English from the University of Waterloo in 1968, Regehr worked in journalism and for a member of Parliament, during which time he wrote his first book Making a Killing: Canada’s Arms Industry. Regehr and his wife Nancy then served with Mennonite Central Committee in South Africa, Zambia and Botswana from 1974-1976 before returning to Canada.

Remarking on his experiences in southern Africa, Regehr noted:

In 1976, Regehr contacted Murray Thompson, who was the Executive Director of CUSO (then known as Canadian University Service Overseas). The two began a research project on militarism and underdevelopment, and co-founded Project Ploughshares as an organizational extension to this research on July 1, 1976.

Awards
Regehr’s peace and security work has been honoured with a number of awards. He was named an Officer of the Order of Canada in 2003, and in January 2011 he became the 26th laureate of the Pearson Peace Medal. Regehr was also a recipient of the University of Waterloo 50th Anniversary Alumni Award in 2007  and the Arthur Kroeger College Award for Ethics in Public Affairs in 2008.

Works
Regehr has written a number of books and articles about peace and security issues. His publications include:

 

Regehr has also written numerous articles in newspapers, reports and scholarly journals.

See also
 List of peace activists

References 

Living people
Canadian activists
Canadian pacifists
Officers of the Order of Canada
University of Waterloo alumni
Year of birth missing (living people)